Lucídio Portela Nunes (8 April 1922 – 30 October 2015) was a Brazilian doctor and politician. He served as the Governor of Piauí from 1979 to 1983.

Biography
Born in Valença do Piauí in 1922, Nunes was the Governor of Piauí from 1979 to 1983. He was the elder brother of the late Petrônio Portela Nunes, an advocate for political openness during the governments of Ernesto Geisel and João Figueiredo.
He died on 30 October 2015 in Teresina.

References

1922 births
2015 deaths
Governors of Piauí
Vice Governors of Piauí
20th-century Brazilian physicians
Federal University of Rio de Janeiro alumni